Enamorada (English: Enamored) is the 19th studio album by Mexican pop singer Yuri. It was released in 2002, and sold more than 45,000.

Reception
Yuri comes back to the secular public view with this album under the supervision of Muxxic Latina. With this album she tries to return to her time-worn Pop, ballad, and R&B roots, but without leaving her fanatical religious belief. Her first single "Ya no vives en mí" ("You don't live in me anymore") was well received in radio stations, especially in Chile and Central America, however in Mexico cataclysmically failed in the charts due to little promotion from the label; Yuri left the label for Sony Music.

Track listing
Tracks  [] :

Track listing

Production
 Executive production: Marco A. Rubí
 Producción and management: Alex Zepeda
 Label: Muxxic Latina
 Musical arrangements: Hugo Warnholtz, Joan Romagoza and Alex Zepeda
 Musicians: Michael Landau (electric guitar), Neil Stubenhouse (bass guitar), Charlie King (acoustic guitars), Joan Romagoza (acoustic guitars), Jaime De la Parra (acoustic guitar), Hugo Warnholtz (acoustic piano), Alex Zepeda (drums and percussion), L.A. Philharmonic Orchestra (strings), Tony Concepcion (trumpet), Jim Hacker (trumpet), Jason Carder (trumpet), Dana Teboe (trombone), John Kticker (trombone)
 Backing vocals: Miriam Ubalde, Robert Wilson, Natalia Sosa, Diana Rosverit and Jorge Flores
 Recorded in: Advance Zound and One Take Miamai by Javier Carrión
 Mixing: Westlake (A) Audio By Rubén López
 Mastering: Fulter Sound by Mike Fuller
 Photography: Adolfo Pérez Butron
 Graphic Design: Alberto Carballo
 Make up: Javier de la Rosa
 Stylist: Manuel Lupa

Singles
 Ya no vives en mí
 Quién te ha pedido amor
 Hasta que vuelva a mí
 Baile Caliente (Only Chile)
 Ay que linda es la vida (Only Chile)

Single Charts

References

2002 albums
Yuri (Mexican singer) albums